Moinabad (also Romanized as Mo‘īnābād; also known as Bonyābād, Meynābād, and Qal‘eh Mainābād) is a village in Zirkuh Rural District, Central District, Zirkuh County, South Khorasan Province, Iran. At the 2006 census, its population was 17, in 4 families.

References 

Populated places in Zirkuh County